The Eli Lilly Award in Biological Chemistry was established in 1934. Consisting of a bronze medal and honorarium, its purpose is to stimulate fundamental research in biological chemistry by scientists not over thirty-eight years of age. The Award is administered by the Division of Biological Chemistry of the American Chemical Society.

Recipients
Past recipients of the Lilly Award:

1935 – Willard Myron Allen
1937 – 
1938 – 
1939 – George Wald
1940 – 
1941 – David Rittenberg
1942 – Earl A. Evans, Jr.
1943 – Herbert E. Carter
1944 – Joseph S. Fruton
1945 – 
1946 – John D. Ferry
1947 – Sidney Colowick
1948 – Dilworth Wayne Woolley
1949 – 
1950 – 
1951 – John M. Buchanan
1952 – 
1953 – Nathan O. Kaplan
1954 – Harvey A. Itano
1955 – William F. Neuman
1956 – Robert A. Alberty
1957 – Harold A. Scheraga
1958 – Lester J. Reed
1959 – Paul Berg
1960 – James D. Watson
1961 – 
1962 – Jerard Hurwitz
1963 – William P. Jencks
1964 – Bruce N. Ames
1965 – Gerald M. Edelman
1966 – Phillips W. Robbins
1967 – Gordon G. Hammes
1968 – Charles C. Richardson
1969 – Mario R. Capecchi
1970 – Lubert Stryer
1971 – 
1972 – Bruce M. Alberts
1973 – 
1974 – James Dahlberg
1975 – Mark Ptashne
1976 – Joan A. Steitz
1977 – Robert G. Roeder
1978 – Charles R. Cantor
1979 – Christopher T. Walsh
1980 – Phillip A. Sharp
1981 – Roger D. Kornberg
1982 – Harold M. Weintraub
1983 – Richard Axel
1984 – David V. Goeddel
1985 – Gerald M. Rubin
1986 – James E. Rothman
1987 – Jacqueline K. Barton
1988 – Peter Walter
1989 – 
1990 – George L. McLendon
1991 – Peter G. Schultz
1992 – William DeGrado
1993 – Stuart L. Schreiber
1994 – Peter S. Kim
1995 – Jeremy Berg
1996 – Gregory L. Verdine
1997 – Alanna Schepartz
1998 – John Kuriyan
1999 – Chaitan Khosla
2000 – Xiaodong Wang
2001 – Jennifer Doudna
2002 – Kevan M. Shokat
2003 – Andreas Matouschek
2004 – Benjamin Cravatt III
2005 – 
2006 – Linda Hsieh-Wilson
2007 – Anna K. Mapp
2008 – 
2009 – Scott K. Silverman
2010 – Alice Y. Ting
2011 – Nathanael Gray
2012 – Christopher J. Chang
2013 – 
2014 – 
2015 – 
2016 – Elizabeth Nolan
2017 – Howard C. Hang
2018 – Bradley L. Pentelute 
2019 – Neal Devaraj
2020 – Yimon Aye
2021 – Jordan L. Meier 
2022 – Lingyin Li
2023 – Polly Fordyce

See also

 List of biochemistry awards

References

External links 
 Division of Biological Chemistry, American Chemical Society

Biochemistry awards
American science and technology awards
Awards established in 1934
1934 establishments in the United States